Junior Cally, pseudonym of Antonio Signore (born 10 October 1991) is an Italian rapper. Junior Cally owes its name to a Jamaican reggae singer, Junior Kelly, who has always been "against" the political establishment of his country.

He debuted in 2017 with the single "Alcatraz" and his first album titled Ci entro dentro was released on 2 November 2018.

Junior Cally participated at the Sanremo Music Festival 2020 with the song "No grazie".

Biography 
The little information about his adolescence is revealed to us in his book Il principe. He writes that he was diagnosed with leukemia at the age of 15, but which marked him to the point of later manifesting obsessive-compulsive personality disorder.

Junior Cally has admitted to abusing alcohol at age 20 only to realize he had to take his life in hand and change it: "I told myself do something, live your life better. I tried to make up for lost time".

He found considerable success after the episode that occurred on September 4, 2019 in the video clip of the single "Tutti con me", which anticipated the release of his second album Wanted, released on September 6, 2019. In the first scenes of the music video, the Roman rapper, always known with a gas mask on his face, he decided after two years of career, to reveal his identity by showing himself to the public.

Discography

Studio albums 
 2018 – Ci entro dentro
 2019 – Ricercato

EP 

 2012 – Dalla strada al palco osceno (as Socio)
 2013 – Punto di partenza (as Socio)

Singoli 

 2017 – Alcatraz
 2017 – Guantanamo
 2017 – Arkham
 2017 – Pussy
 2017 – Regola 1
 2017 – Regola 50
 2017 – Cally Whale
 2017 – Strega
 2017 – Magicabula
 2018 – Quando arrivo io (feat. Gabry Ponte)
 2018 – Wannabe (feat. Highsnob)
 2018 – Capelli rossi
 2018 – Valzer
 2018 – Bulldozer
 2019 – Wannabe vol. 2 (feat. Highsnob)
 2019 – Montecarlo
 2019 – Tutti con me
 2019 – Sigarette
 2020 – No grazie
 2020 – Wannabe vol.3 (feat. Highsnob, Enzo Dong)
 2021 – Amore di mezzo
 2021 – Come Monet

References

Italian rappers
Living people
Masked musicians
21st-century Italian singers
1991 births
21st-century Italian male singers
People with obsessive-compulsive personality disorder